Pietrzykowice may refer to the following places in Poland:
Pietrzykowice, Gmina Długołęka in Lower Silesian Voivodeship (south-west Poland)
Pietrzykowice, Gmina Kąty Wrocławskie in Lower Silesian Voivodeship (south-west Poland)
Pietrzykowice, Silesian Voivodeship (south Poland)